Joseph Manning may refer to:

 Joseph S. Manning (1845–1905),  U.S. Army private and Medal of Honor recipient
 Joseph P. Manning (1827–1916), pioneer who crossed the Oregon Trail in 1848
 M. Joseph Manning (1924–2015), US politician
 Joseph Manning (historian), professor of history at Yale University